The R4 (also known as Revolution for DS) is a flash cartridge for the Nintendo DS handheld system. It allows ROMs and homebrew to be booted on the Nintendo DS handheld system from a microSD card. This allows the user to run homebrew applications, to store multiple games and MP3 music files on a single memory card, and to play games that have been backed up by the user.

The R4 flashcard's original developer stopped production, however, due to the popularity of the original R4 there are many other Nintendo DS flashcards using the R4 name despite the lack of any connection to the original. Some of these cartridges can also store a 3DS boot image; a 3DS can in turn be made to boot from the cartridge by way of an undocumented button combination recognized by the system's bootloader. Since the 3DS's secure boot signature validation has been broken, this provides a useful means of installing custom firmware on a 3DS.

Original cards
The original R4 cards use a microSD (≤2GB) card for its firmware and games, and does not support SDHC microSD cards. The original Revolution for DS card is no longer sold, however cards commonly referred to as 1:1 clones can still be purchased online. These are flashcards that use exactly the same hardware and are, for all intents and purposes, also referred to as the original R4 revolution.

Notable clones
Due to the popularity of the original R4 cartridge and subsequent continued popularity of other cards using the name, Nintendo DS flashcards using R4 in their names is still very common despite the original having long since stopped production. These flashcards, referred to as clones, commonly add words to their names to denote their features such as SDHC if it supports SDHC microSD cards, RTS if it has Real Time Save support, and DSi or 3DS often paired with changing R4 to R4i if it works on the Nintendo DSi or 3DS consoles. It is also very common for clone cartridges to include words such as Gold, Plus, Ultra, and Dual-Core which only serve to make the card sound impressive.

R4i Gold 3DS Plus (r4ids.cn)
The R4i Gold 3DS Plus from r4ids.cn is notable for featuring a switch inside that cartridge that allows easily switching between being a normal NintendoDS flashcard and a mode that allows it to be used for the ntrboot exploit for the Nintendo 3DS. This unique feature, combined with its high compatibility and support for RTS, made it formerly a highly recommended card, however its final production run was defective and unable to play Nintendo DS ROMs.

r4isdhc.com
 
r4isdhc.com has produced many R4 clones, typically going by the names "R4iSDHC Gold", "R4iSDHC RTS Lite", and "R4iSDHC Dual-Core". Despite the different names all cards from this website are exactly the same internally, only differing in the cartridge color and label. Cards branded r4isdhc.com are also labelled with a specific year and use a time bomb where the card refuses to load Nintendo DS ROMs after a certain date. This time bomb is only enforced by software, however, so it can be bypassed easily.

Ace3DS+ 
Ace3DS+ carts use their own boards and are not clones of other carts, this cart often gets confused for the predecessor Ace3DS which was a DSTT clone. The Ace3DS+ is infamous for being one of the most cloned carts with most modern clone R4 cards running Ace3DS+ based software. The most infamous carts to run Ace3DS+ based codes are the carts that include often pirated games which are currently being sold on online shops like eBay and Amazon.

Legal issues
R4 flash cartridges are banned in some countries due to copyright infringement lawsuits from Nintendo. In late 2007, Nintendo began a legal crackdown with a series of raids against R4 merchants.

United Kingdom
In 2010, the company Playables Limited, importers of R4 flashcards, was ruled against by the London High Court. The ruling outlawed any sales, importation, or advertising of the R4 flashcards. The defence of Playables Limited claimed that the R4 flashcards were legal because it uses a homebrew application.  However, bypassing Nintendo's security system is against the law in the United Kingdom.  After the news broke, Nintendo released on a statement saying that they do support game developers that create their own applications legitimately.  100,000 copying devices including R4s were seized in 2009.  Nintendo claimed that the cards were not only seized for the benefit of their own company, but the benefit for over 1400 video game companies that depend on the sales of their games.

France
In October 2011, the R4 cards were banned in France. While Nintendo's original lawsuit was dismissed on the basis that the devices could be used to make homebrews and develop software in 2009, the 2011 ruling reversed this, and the Paris court of appeals ruled against five R4 sellers and distributors. The sellers and distributors were fined over €460,000, and some were sentenced to jail. Stephan Bole, the managing director of Nintendo France released a statement saying "Nintendo supported this criminal action not only for the company’s sake, but for the interests of its game developer partners who spend time and money legitimately developing software for Nintendo’s game platforms, and customers who expect the highest standards and integrity from products bearing the Nintendo name."

Japan
In 2009, the government of Japan outlawed the sales of the R4 flashcard. In 2012, the Japanese Ministry of Economy, Trade, and Industry revealed that the importing of R4 cards, and similar devices, is now punishable by law.   In 2013, Nintendo won a court case against two R4 card distributors in Japan. The Tokyo district court ruled that the sellers of the R4 cards owed Nintendo and 49 other video game developers ¥95,625,000.

Germany
In 2009, Nintendo lost a lawsuit against a seller of flashcards, however Nintendo won the second and final instance. Since December 2014, flashcards are officially illegal due to Germany's copyright law. The seller and distributor of the R4 flashcards was fined over €1 million.

Italy 
In 2009, Nintendo started a lawsuit against a seller of flashcards, which lasted three instances and ended only in 2017 with the sentence of the seller, however the punishment is undisclosed. Curiously, in another trial held in 2016 Court of Catania declared flashcards legal since they have been exchanged for microSD-to-DScart adapters, citing the fact the R4 is not able to run any copyrighted code without a kernel, which is not sold with the flashcard, and the hardware-embedded protection breaking functionalities were considerate legitimate to run unsigned code.

Other countries
Other countries that have banned the R4 flashcards include Australia, Belgium, the Netherlands, and South Korea.

See also
Nintendo DS and 3DS storage devices

References

Nintendo DS accessories
Copyright infringement of software
Unlicensed Nintendo hardware